The year 2019 is the 9th year in the history of the ONE Championship, a mixed martial arts, kickboxing and muay thai promotion based in Singapore.

Background
Chatri Sityodtong announced that ONE Championship will do 45 events in 2019: 24 ONE Championship events, 12 ONE Hero Series events, 6 ONE Warrior Series events and 3 ONE Esports events.

He also announced that they will organise multiple Grand Prix this year. He announces a flyweight and a lightweight Grand Prix tournaments in mixed martial arts and a featherweight kickboxing Grand Prix with 8 fighters.

List of events

ONE Championship

ONE Hero Series

ONE Warrior Series

Title fights

Grand Prix Participant

8-Man MMA Lightweight 77 kg GP Participant
  Honorio Banario 
  Lowen Tynanes
  Eddie Alvarez
  Timofey Nastyukhin
  Amir Khan 
  Ariel Sexton
  Saygid Guseyn Arslanaliev
  Ev Ting

8-Man MMA Flyweight 61 kg GP Participant
  Demetrious Johnson
  Kairat Akhmetov 
  Gustavo Balart
  Yuya Wakamatsu
  Danny Kingad
  Tatsumitsu Wada 
  Reece McLaren 
  Senzo Ikeda

8-Man Kickboxing Featherweight 70 kg GP Participant
  Dzhabar Askerov
  Yodsanklai Fairtex 
  Sasha Moisa
  Giorgio Petrosyan
  Jo Nattawut
  Enriko Kehl
  Samy Sana
  Phetmorakot Petchyindee Academy

Grand Prix bracket

ONE Lightweight Grand Prix bracket

 Amir Khan replaced injured Ariel Sexton at the semi-finals.
 Eddie Alvarez replaced injured Lowen Tynanes at the semi-finals.
 Eduard Folayang replaced injured Timofey Nastyukhin at the semi-finals.
 Christian Lee will replace injured Eddie Alvarez in the final.

ONE Flyweight Grand Prix bracket

 Reece McLaren will replace injured Kairat Akhmetov at the semi-finals

ONE Kickboxing Featherweight Grand Prix bracket

 Sasha Moisa will replace Andy Souwer at the quarter-finals.

ONE Championship: Eternal Glory

ONE Championship: Eternal Glory (also known as ONE Championship 85) was a Combat sport event held by ONE Championship on January 19, 2019 at the Istora Senayan in Jakarta, Indonesia.

Background

This event features title fight for the ONE Strawweight Championship between the champion Joshua Pacio and the top contender Yosuke Saruta as ONE: Eternal Glory headliner.

Hayato Suzuki was to challenge Joshua Pacio for the strawweight title at this event, but had to withdraw due to an injury. He was replaced by Yosuke Saruta.

Kharun Atlangeriev was scheduled to face Koji Ando, but Atlangeriev was forced off the card on January 3 with an injury. Rasul Yakhyaev served as Atlangeriev's replacement.

Results

ONE Championship: Hero's Ascent

ONE Championship: Hero's Ascent (also known as ONE Championship 86) was a Combat sport event held by ONE Championship on January 25, 2019 at the Mall of Asia Arena in Pasay, Philippines.

Background
This event features a trilogy fight between the champion Geje Eustaquio and the former champion Adriano Moraes for the ONE Flyweight Championship as ONE: Hero's Ascent headliner.

This card also featured the first bout in the ONE Championship Lightweight World Grand Prix Tournament between the American Lowen Tynanes and Honorio Banario.

Results

ONE Hero Series January

ONE Hero Series January was a Combat sport event held by ONE Championship on January 28, 2019 in Beijing, China.

Background

Results

ONE Championship: Clash of Legends

ONE Championship: Clash of Legends (also known as ONE Championship 87) was a Combat sport event held by ONE Championship on February 16, 2019 at the IMPACT Arena in Bangkok, Thailand.

Background
This event features a title fight between Nong-O Gaiyanghadao and Han Zi Hao for the inaugural ONE Muay Thai Bantamweight Championship as ONE: Clash of Legends headliner.

Results

ONE Championship: Call to Greatness

ONE Championship: Call to Greatness (also known as ONE Championship 88) was a Combat sport event held by ONE Championship on February 22, 2019 at the Singapore Indoor Stadium in Kallang, Singapore.

Background
This event features a title fight between the ONE Kickboxing Women's Atomweight Championship Stamp Fairtex and American Muay Thai champion Janet Todd for the inaugural ONE Muay Thai Atomweight Championship as ONE: Call to Greatness headliner.

An Atomweight bout between Mei Yamaguchi and Meng Bo was previously scheduled for ONE: Call to Greatness. However, Meng Bo pulled out of the fight due to foot injury and the bout was scrapped.

Rahul Raju was scheduled to face Ahmed Mujtaba at ONE: Call to Greatness. However, Mujtaba pulled out of the fight due to visa issues. In turn, promotion officials rescheduled the pairing for ONE Championship: Reign of Valor event March 9, 2019 in Yangon, Myanmar.

Results

ONE Hero Series February

ONE Hero Series February was a Combat sport event held by ONE Championship on February 25, 2019 in Beijing, China.

Background

Results

ONE Warrior Series 4

ONE Warrior Series 4 was a Combat sport event held by ONE Championship on February 28, 2019 in Kallang, Singapore.

Background

Results

ONE Championship: Reign of Valor

ONE Championship: Reign of Valor (also known as ONE Championship 89) was a Combat sport event held by ONE Championship on March 8, 2019 at the Thuwunna Indoor Stadium in Yangon, Myanmar.

Background
This event features a title fight between the champion Zebaztian Kadestam and Georgiy Kichigin for ONE Welterweight Championship as ONE: Reign of Valor headliner.

Results

ONE Hero Series March

ONE Hero Series March was a Combat sport event held by ONE Championship on March 25, 2019 in Beijing, China.

Background

Results

ONE Championship: A New Era

ONE Championship: A New Era (also known as ONE Championship 90) was a Combat sport event held by ONE Championship on March 31, 2019 at the Ryōgoku Kokugikan in Tokyo, Japan.

Background
Andrew Leone was scheduled to face Danny Kingad in the ONE Flyweight World Grand Prix quarterfinal, but Leone was forced off the card on March 14 with an injury. Pancrase Flyweight champion Senzo Ikeda served as Leone replacement.

Ivanildo Delfino was set to fight with Tatsumitsu Wada in the first round of the ONE Flyweight World Grand Prix, but Delfino had to withdraw due to an injury. As a result of this, the bout will be rescheduled for a later date.

Results

ONE Championship: Roots of Honor

ONE Championship: Roots of Honor (also known as ONE Championship 91) was a Combat sport event held by ONE Championship on April 12, 2019 at the Mall of Asia Arena in Pasay, Philippines.

Background
Tang Kai was set to fight with Eric Kelly but he has to withdraw a week before the fight due to health issues. Kwon Won Il replaces Kai, takes short notice fight against Kelly.

Results

ONE Hero Series April

ONE Hero Series April was a Combat sport event held by ONE Championship on April 22, 2019 in Beijing, China.

Background

Results

ONE Warrior Series 5

ONE Warrior Series 5 was a Combat sport event held by ONE Championship on April 25, 2019 in Kallang, Singapore.

Background

Results

ONE Championship: For Honor

ONE Championship: For Honor (also known as ONE Championship 92) was a Combat sport event held by ONE Championship on May 3, 2019 at the Istora Senayan in Jakarta, Indonesia.

Background
This event features a title fight between the champion Sam-A Gaiyanghadao and Jonathan Haggerty for ONE Welterweight Championship as ONE Muay Thai Flyweight Championship headliner.

Results

ONE Championship: Warriors Of Light

ONE Championship: Warriors Of Light was a Combat sport event held by ONE Championship on May 10, 2019 at the IMPACT Arena in Bangkok, Thailand.

Background
This event featured two world title fights for the ONE Muay Thai Bantamweight Championship Nong-O Gaiyanghadao vs. Hiroaki Suzuki as headliner and for the inaugural ONE Kickboxing Flyweight Championship Petchdam Gaiyanghadao vs. Elias Mahmoudi as co-headliner.

Results

ONE Championship: Enter the Dragon

ONE Championship: Enter the Dragon was a Combat sport event held by ONE Championship on May 17, 2019 at the Singapore Indoor Stadium in Kallang, Singapore.

Background
The ONE Lightweight GP semi final bout between Ariel Sexton and Saygid Guseyn Arslanaliev was expected for ONE Championship: Enter the Dragon. On April 24, however, Sexton pulled out of the bout due to an arm injury. Amir Khan was pulled from a planned preliminary bout with Iurie Lapicus and faced Guseyn Arslanaliev in the GP semi final bout. Lapicus instead faced Shannon Wiratchai.

Andy Souwer was scheduled to face Jo Nattawut in the ONE Kickboxing Grand Prix quarter-finals, but Souwer has to withdraw from the bout due to undisclosed reasons. Sasha Moisa was pulled from a planned Grand Prix alternate bout with Daniel Dawson and faced Nattawut in the GP quarter-final bout. Dawson instead faced Brown Pinas in the GP alternate bout.

The bout between Giorgio Petrosyan and Phetmorakot Petchyindee Academy was originally a split decision win for Phetmorakot. However the ONE Championship competition committee has declared the bout a no contest.

Results

ONE Hero Series May

ONE Hero Series May was a Combat sport event held by ONE Championship on May 27, 2019 in Beijing, China.

Background

Results

ONE Hero Series June

ONE Hero Series June was a Combat sport event held by ONE Championship on June 14, 2019 in Shanghai, China.

Background

Results

ONE Championship: Legendary Quest

ONE Championship: Legendary Quest (also known as ONE Championship 95) was a Combat sport event held by ONE Championship on June 15, 2019 at the Baoshan Arena in Shanghai, China.

Background
This event features a title fight between the champion Stamp Fairtex and Alma Juniku for ONE Muay Thai Women's Atomweight Championship as ONE: Legendary Quest headliner.

Results

ONE Warrior Series 6

ONE Warrior Series 6 was a Combat sport event held by ONE Championship on June 20, 2019 in Kallang, Singapore.

Background

Results

ONE Championship: Masters Of Destiny

ONE Championship: Masters Of Destiny (also known as ONE Championship 96) was a Combat sport event held by ONE Championship on July 12, 2019 at the Axiata Arena in Kuala Lumpur, Malaysia.

Background
This event featured the Grand-Prix Quarter-finals rematch between Giorgio Petrosyan and Phetmorakot Petchyindee Academy as ONE: Masters Of Destiny headliner.

Results

ONE Hero Series July

ONE Hero Series July was a combat sport event held by ONE Championship on July 21, 2019 in Beijing, China.

Results

ONE Championship: Dawn of Heroes

ONE Championship: Dawn Of Heroes was a Combat sport event held by ONE Championship on August 2, 2019 at the Mall of Asia Arena in Pasay, Philippines.

Background
The Flyweight Grand-Prix Semi-finals bout between Danny Kingad and Kairat Akhmetov was expected for the ONE Championship: Dawn Of Heroes main card. On July 8, however, Akhmetov was forced to withdraw due to an injury. Reece McLaren was pulled from a planned preliminary card bout with Yuya Wakamatsu and faced Kingad in the Grand-Prix Semi-finals bout. Wakamatsu instead faced the former ONE Flyweight World Champion Geje Eustaquio, who stepped in on short notice for this encounter.

Mauro Cerilli has been forced to withdraw from his scheduled fight against Arjan Bhullar due to undisclosed reasons. That forced the fight to be cancelled.

Results

ONE Warrior Series 7

ONE Warrior Series 7 was a Combat sport event held by ONE Championship on August 6, 2019 in Kallang, Singapore.

Background

Results

ONE Championship: Dreams of Gold

ONE Championship: Dreams of Gold was a Combat sport event held by ONE Championship on August 16, 2019 at the IMPACT Arena in Bangkok, Thailand.

Background
Shuya Kamikubo was scheduled to face Yusup Saadulaev in the main card, but Kamikubo was forced off the card due to an eye infection. Former ONE bantamweight title challenger Dae Hwan Kim served as Kamikubo replacement, takes short notice fight against Saadulaev.

Results

ONE Hero Series August

ONE Hero Series August was a combat sport event held by ONE Championship on August 26, 2019 in Beijing, China.

Results

ONE Championship: Immortal Triumph

ONE Championship: Immortal Triumph (also known as ONE Championship 99) was a Combat sport event held by ONE Championship on September 6, 2019 at the Phú Thọ Indoor Stadium in Ho Chi Minh City, Vietnam.

Background
Rafi Bohic has been forced to withdraw from his scheduled co main event bout against Saemapetch Fairtex due to an injury, Azize Hlali has stepped in as a replacement. Unfortunately, Hlali has been unable to compete. Fairtex instead faced Adam Larfi, who stepped in on a weeks notice for this encounter. On fight day, Adam Larfi was pulled out of the fight due to skin infection and the bout with Fairtex was scrapped.

Thanonchai SomawangGaiyang has been forced to withdraw from his scheduled fight against Kohei Kodera due to undisclosed reasons. Kodera instead faced the Lumpinee Muay Thai World Champion Singtongnoi Por Telakun, who stepped in on short notice for this encounter.

A featherweight bout between Thanh Tung Nguyen and Shahzaib Rindh was previously scheduled for ONE: Immortal Triumph. However, Nguyen pulled out of the fight for undisclosed reasons and the bout was scrapped.

Results

ONE Hero Series September 

ONE Hero Series September was a Combat sport event held by ONE Championship on September 23, 2019 in Beijing, China.

Background

Results

ONE Warrior Series 8 

ONE Warrior Series 8 was a Combat sport event held by ONE Championship on October 5, 2019 at the Bellesalle Shibuya Garden in Tokyo, Japan.

Background

Results

ONE Championship: Century

ONE Championship: Century (also known as ONE Championship 100) will be a Combat sport event held by ONE Championship on October 13, 2019 at the Ryōgoku Kokugikan in Tokyo, Japan.

Background
This event mark's ONE Championship's historic 100th show.

Results

Part 1

Part 2

ONE Championship: Dawn Of Valor

ONE Championship: Dawn Of Valor (also known as  ONE Championship 101) was a Combat sport event held by ONE Championship on October 25, 2019 at the Istora Senayan in Jakarta, Indonesia.

Background
A middleweight bout between Leandro Ataides and Vitaly Bigdash was previously scheduled for the main card. However, Bigdash has been forced to pull out of the fight when he has suffered a staph infection and the bout was scrapped.

Results

ONE Hero Series October 

ONE Hero Series October was a Combat sport event held by ONE Championship on October 28, 2019 in Beijing, China.

Background

Results

ONE Championship: Masters Of Fate 

ONE Championship: Masters Of Fate (also known as ONE Championship 102) was a Combat sport event held by ONE Championship on November 8, 2019 at the Mall of Asia Arena in Pasay, Philippines.

Background
Emilio Urrutia has been forced to withdraw from his scheduled fight against Jae Woong Kim due to undisclosed reasons. Kim instead faced the Brazilian Rafael Nunes, who stepped in on short notice for this encounter.

Alma Juniku was scheduled to face Anne Line Hogstad in the main card, but Juniku suffered an injury in training and withdrew from the fight. The bout was scrapped.

Results

ONE Championship: Age Of Dragons

ONE Championship: Age Of Dragons (also known as ONE Championship 103) was a Combat sport event held by ONE Championship on November 16, 2019 at the Cadillac Arena in Beijing, China.

Background
Sasha Moisa has been forced to withdraw from his scheduled fight against Yodsaenklai Fairtex due to undisclosed reasons. Fairtex instead faced the Russian Jamal Yusupov, who stepped in on short notice for this encounter.

Cindy Tiong has been forced to withdraw from his scheduled fight against Ritu Phogat due to undisclosed reasons. Nam-Hee Kim served as Tiong replacement, takes short notice fight against Phogat.

Results

ONE Hero Series November 

ONE Hero Series November was a Combat sport event held by ONE Championship on November 18, 2019 in Beijing, China.

Background

Results

ONE Championship: Edge Of Greatness 

ONE Championship: Edge Of Greatness (also known as ONE Championship 104) will be a Combat sport event held by ONE Championship on November 22, 2019 at the Singapore Indoor Stadium in Kallang, Singapore.

Background
A bout between Tiffany Teo and Maira Mazar was cancelled a week before the event due to an eye injury, Teo was not medically cleared to fight.

Rahul Raju was expected to face Ahmed Mujtaba, but visa issues forced Mujtaba out of the fight. Furkan Cheema has stepped in on short notice against Raju. They both missed weight for their lightweight fight, the bout was held at 80 kg catchweight.

Results

ONE Warrior Series 9

ONE Warrior Series 9 was a Combat sport event held by ONE Championship on December 4, 2019 in Kallang, Singapore.

Background

Results

ONE Championship: Mark Of Greatness

ONE Championship: Mark Of Greatness (also known as ONE Championship 105) was a Combat sport event held by ONE Championship on December 6, 2019 at the Axiata Arena in Kuala Lumpur, Malaysia.

Background
Fabio Pinca was scheduled to face Chang-Min Yoon in the main card, but Pinca suffered an injury in training and withdrew from the fight. Rodian Menchaves served as Pinca replacement, takes short notice fight against Yoon. The bout was held at 72 kg catchweight.

Mohammad Karaki had suffered an injury and was pulling out of his bout with Agilan Thani. Karaki was replaced by former LFA veteran Dante Schiro.

Results

ONE Hero Series December 

ONE Hero Series December was a Combat sport event held by ONE Championship on December 16, 2019 in Beijing, China.

Background

Results

See also
 2019 in UFC 
 Bellator MMA in 2019
 2019 in Rizin Fighting Federation 
 2019 in Absolute Championship Akhmat 
 2019 in M-1 Global 
 2020 in Fight Nights Global
 2019 in Konfrontacja Sztuk Walki 
 2019 in Road FC 
 2019 in Glory
 2019 in Kunlun Fight
 2019 in Romanian kickboxing

References

External links
ONE Championship

ONE Championship events
ONE Championship events
2019 in mixed martial arts
2019 in kickboxing
2019 sport-related lists